The Battlefords was a federal electoral district in Saskatchewan, Canada, that was represented in the House of Commons of Canada from 1935 to 1968.

This riding was created in 1933 from parts of North Battleford, Rosetown and South Battleford ridings.

It was abolished in 1966 when it was redistributed into Meadow Lake, Battleford—Kindersley and Saskatoon—Biggar  ridings.

Members of Parliament 

This ridings elected the following Members of Parliament:

Joseph Needham, Social Credit (1935–1940)
John Albert Gregory, Liberal (1940–1945)
Max Campbell, Co-operative Commonwealth Federation (CCF) (1945–1949)
Arthur James Bater, Liberal (1949–1953)
Max Campbell, CCF (1953–1958)
Albert Horner, Progressive Conservative (1958–1968)

Election results

See also 

 List of Canadian federal electoral districts
 Past Canadian electoral districts

External links 

Former federal electoral districts of Saskatchewan